Paraflabellina is a genus of sea slugs, aeolid nudibranchs, marine gastropod mollusks in the family Flabellinidae.

Species
There are four species within the genus Paraflabellina:
 Paraflabellina funeka (Gosliner & Griffiths, 1981)
 Paraflabellina gabinierei (Vicente, 1975)
 Paraflabellina ischitana (Hirano & Thompson, 1990)
 Paraflabellina rubromaxilla (Edmunds, 2015)

References 

Flabellinidae
Gastropod genera